is a Japanese football player. He plays for Grulla Morioka.

Playing career
Shun Tanaka joined to Arte Takasaki in 2011. He moved to Japan Soccer College in 2012, to Grulla Morioka in 2013. In 2016, he moved to Azul Claro Numazu.

Club statistics
Updated to 23 February 2019.

References

External links

Profile at Azul Claro Numazu

1988 births
Living people
Rikkyo University alumni
Association football people from Shizuoka Prefecture
Japanese footballers
J3 League players
Japan Football League players
Arte Takasaki players
Japan Soccer College players
Iwate Grulla Morioka players
Azul Claro Numazu players
Association football defenders